Daniel Bazuin (born July 22, 1983) is a former American football defensive end. He was drafted by the Chicago Bears in the second round the 2007 NFL Draft. He was drafted out of Central Michigan.  While at Central Michigan University, he graduated with a bachelor's degree in marketing.

College career
Bazuin played from 2003 to 2006 for Central Michigan.  At the time he left Central Michigan, he was the team's career leader in sacks and tackles for loss. He was selected as the MAC Conference Defensive player of the year for the 2006 season.

Professional career

Chicago Bears
The Bears signed Bazuin to a four-year contract on July 25, 2007.  Bazuin was placed on injured reserve on September 1, 2007, by the Chicago Bears due to a knee injury. On August 29, 2008, Bazuin was waived by the Bears after requiring a second operation on the same knee.

Houston Texans
Bazuin was signed to the practice squad of the Houston Texans on December 5, 2008.

References

External links
 Central Michigan Chippewas bio
 

1983 births
Living people
Players of American football from Michigan
American football defensive ends
Central Michigan Chippewas football players
Chicago Bears players
Houston Texans players
People from Missaukee County, Michigan